The 2B14 Podnos (2Б14 "Поднос"- Platter) is a Soviet 82 mm mortar. The 2B14 was designed in early 1980s as a light indirect fire weapon for the use of airborne and other light infantry forces. Despite the intent to field the 2B14 with light infantry units, the 2B14 appears to have been fielded with regular motor rifle units as well at a scale of six per battalion.

Variants
 2B14 (2Б14)
 2B14-1 (2Б14-1-1)

Operators

Current operators
  – Used by Georgian Army
  – In service with the Malaysian Army
  – The Russians are believed to have about 276 in service and 3,000 in storage.
  – In use with the Syrian Arab Army.
  – Used by both government forces and Russian-backed rebels in the Russo-Ukrainian War.

Former operators
  – Passed down to successor states.
 Lebanese Forces (militia)

References

Infantry mortars
Mortars of the Soviet Union
Cold War artillery of the Soviet Union
Artillery of Russia
82 mm artillery
Nizhny Novgorod Machine-building Plant products
82 mm mortars